This is a complete list of the operas by André Ernest Modeste Grétry (1741–1813).

List

References
Sources
Bartlet, M Elizabeth C (1992), 'Grétry, André-Ernest-Modeste' (work-list) in The New Grove Dictionary of Opera, ed. Stanley Sadie (London) 
Some of the information in this article is taken from the related Dutch Wikipedia article.

 
Lists of operas by composer
Lists of compositions by composer